The Corriente River (Spanish, Río Corriente) is a river in the Argentine province of Corrientes, in the Mesopotamia. It flows southwest, across marshes (bañados), and empties into the flood plain of the Paraná River near the city of Esquina.

See also
 List of rivers of Argentina

References

Rivers of Argentina
Rivers of Corrientes Province
Tributaries of the Paraná River